Igor Zutic (born July 15, 1967) is a Croatian-American physicist, focusing in spintronics and spin-polarized transport, high temperature and unconventional superconductivity, ferromagnetic semiconductors, theoretical nanoscience and computational physics at University of Buffalo and an Elected Fellow of the American Physical Society.

References

Further reading
 

1967 births
Living people
University at Buffalo faculty
21st-century American physicists
Croatian physicists
Fellows of the American Physical Society